RobotLAB is an American educational technology company that manufactures robotics and virtual reality products for K-12 and higher education, as well as business robots for retail, hospitality, and medical companies. The company distributes the Pepper and Nao humanoid robots developed by SoftBank Robotics. They are headquartered in San Francisco, California.

RobotLAB is a Google partner and powers Google Expeditions.

Overview
In addition to distributing SoftBank’s Pepper, Nao, and Whiz robots, which can be used as personal assistants and educational tools, RobotLAB also provides educational robots designed for use in K-12 and other classrooms. Their robots are programmed to help instructors teach subjects such as STEM.

In 2020, Google announced their discontinuation of their virtual field trips app Google Expeditions.  RobotLAB, as Google's partner for Expeditions, created a substitute in partnership with Avantis. The Google Expeditions alternative was named VR Expeditions 2.0. RobotLAB also provides robots for assistance for use in retail, medical and other types of businesses.

History
RobotLAB was founded by Elad Inbar, who is also the CEO of Robot App Store, under the name RobotsLAB in Israel in 2007. The company was originally conceptualized as the educational division of Robot App Store. The company eventually spun off into a separate entity and relocated to San Francisco in 2011 and changed its name to RobotLAB Inc.

The company developed a STEM teaching tool, called the RobotsLAB Box. RobotLAB won Robotic Business Review's Game Changer Award for Education in 2013.

In 2014, RobotLAB released STEM-BOT 3D, a 3D-printed robot that students can assemble and program. in 2014, RobotLAB also won the LAUNCHedu competition from the Bill and Melinda Gates Foundation at the SXSW EDU and Kaplan's EdTech Accelerator award.

In 2016, RobtLAB received the Inc 5000 fastest-growing private company award and also ranked first in educational technology category.

In 2020, RobotLAB released VR Expeditions 2.0, an alternative to Google's Expeditions app and also partnered with Avantis to develop applications for ClassVR, a VR platform designed for use in the classroom.

In 2021, RobotLAB became the distributor of their Pepper, Nao, and Whiz robots. In the same year, the Roanoke County Public Library partnered with RobotLAB to create content and programming for Pepper robots used for library purposes.

RobotLAB also partnered with Curious Technologies, in 2021, to distribute the Elias robot model, which is an artificial intelligence designed for language learning.

References

Educational technology
Virtual reality organizations
Technology companies based in California
American companies established in 2007
Companies based in San Francisco
Electronics companies established in 2007
Robotics companies of the United States